"Fascinada" (English: "Fascinated") is a song recorded by Argentine singer Lali, as the third track on her fourth studio album, Libra (2020). It was written by Lali, Rec808, Gino The Ghost, and its producers Rafael Arcaute, Angel López and Federico Vindver. On August 5, 2020, the song was released by Sony Music Argentina as the fourth single from the album.

Background and composition
In "Fascinada", Lali achieves a "soft" pop with elements of urban and dancehall. Lyrically, the song narrates the story that is completely smitten with someone. Lali defined the song as "a love encounter that changes us, transforms us, and makes us feel alive; that first meeting with some who may become someone special in our lives, and who may take us higher in every way". Musically, Lali said: "we aimed at creating a different atmosphere, selecting other types of sounds for the music and playing with the song's structure. In order to transmit the sense of intimacy, we placed my voice in a sensual, almost-whisper way".

Florencia Mauro of Billboard Argentina praised the song for its "renovated and innovative sound"., while Jessica Roiz of Billboard highlighted the song's "hypnotic beat of mild urban melodies and sensual EDM rhythms".

Music video

Production and release
A music video directed by Fernando Rochese and produced by Ghost Kid Films was released on August 5, 2020 on Lali's YouTube channel. The clip was recorded in Madrid, where Lali is settled to shoot Sky Rojo. The video premiered at 5 pm ART.

Synopsis
The music video shows a tropical and psychedelic aesthetic, with changing and surreal elements that enhance the romantic story within the song. In the clip, Lali delivers all her talent, including intricate choreography and extravagant costumes.

Charts

Weekly charts

Year-end charts

References

2020 songs
2020 singles
Spanish-language songs
Latin pop songs
Lali Espósito songs
Sony Music singles
Songs written by Federico Vindver
Songs written by Lali Espósito